Michal Šmarda (born 31 January 1971) is a Czech former football midfielder and current coach.

Club career
He played in the Czech First League, making over 300 appearances for clubs including SK Hradec Králové, FK Viktoria Žižkov and SK Sigma Olomouc. He won the 1998–99 Czech First League with AC Sparta Prague. Šmarda played the final match of his professional career in May 2008 and subsequently moved into coaching.

Coaching career
Šmarda became a coach at Hradec in the Czech 2. Liga in 2008 immediately after ending his playing career. Due to injury problems in the first-team squad, Šmarda played the full 90 minutes in a friendly match for Hradec Králové in February 2012 against FC Astra Ploieşti. In May 2012, Šmarda followed Hradec Králové manager Václav Kotal to FK Baumit Jablonec, becoming assistant manager there. In September 2013, Šmarda joined Zbrojovka Brno alongside Kotal. The duo left the club in June 2016.

In July 2017, Šmarda returned to Hradec as an assistant coach. Šmarda then moved to Vysočina Jihlava on 2 January 2018 under manager Martin Svědík. In November 2018, Svědík was fired and Šmarda took charge of the team on interim basis until 6 December 2018. Later in the same month, Šmarda joined Slovácko once again under Svědík.

In February 2020, he was reunited with Václav Kotal at Sparta Prague. The duo left the club one year later, in February 2021.

Honours

Club
Sparta Prague
Czech First League: 1998–99

References

External links

1971 births
Living people
Czech footballers
Czech First League players
FC Hradec Králové players
SK Sigma Olomouc players
AC Sparta Prague players
FK Chmel Blšany players
FK Viktoria Žižkov players
Bohemians 1905 players
Association football midfielders
Czech football managers
FC Vysočina Jihlava managers